John Wildman (born November 7, 1960) is a Canadian television and film actor. His parents divorced when he was a child and his mother, a model and actress, moved often to find work. Wildman attended fourteen schools in thirteen years.

Career
Wildman began his career as a child actor, performing his first film role in The Huntsman when he was nine. He studied acting at the Dome Theatre in Montreal, and had parts in eight shows over a three year period. 

He is best known for his role as Butch in the 1985 film My American Cousin, for which he won a Genie Award. He played the same character in the 1989 sequel American Boyfriends. Beginning in 1986 Wildman played Neil Campbell on the television series The Campbells.

References

External links

1960 births
Anglophone Quebec people
Canadian male film actors
Canadian male television actors
Canadian male screenwriters
Film directors from Montreal
Living people
Male actors from Montreal
Writers from Montreal
Best Actor Genie and Canadian Screen Award winners